Frantz Pangop T'chidjui (born 18 May 1993) is a Cameroonian professional footballer.

Club
Pangop signed with Minnesota United FC of Major League Soccer on 9 January 2018. Pangop was released by Minnesota at the end of their 2018 season.

On 11 June 2019, Pangop signed with SC Rheindorf Altach of the Austrian Bundesliga.

International career

International goals
Scores and results list Cameroon's goal tally first.

Honours

Club
Coton Sport
Elite One: 2013

References

External links
 
 

1993 births
Living people
Cameroonian footballers
Cameroon international footballers
Footballers from Douala
Association football midfielders
Cameroonian expatriate footballers
Expatriate soccer players in the United States
Cameroonian expatriate sportspeople in the United States
Expatriate footballers in Austria
Cameroonian expatriate sportspeople in Austria
Expatriate footballers in Sweden
Cameroonian expatriate sportspeople in Sweden
Coton Sport FC de Garoua players
Örgryte IS players
Union Douala players
Minnesota United FC players
SC Rheindorf Altach players
Ettan Fotboll players
Major League Soccer players
Austrian Regionalliga players
Cameroon A' international footballers
2018 African Nations Championship players